The former Italian Catholic Diocese of Urbania and Sant’Angelo in Vado, in the Marche, existed from 1636 to 1986. In the latter year, it was united into the Archdiocese of Urbino, to form the Archdiocese of Urbino-Urbania-Sant'Angelo in Vado.

History

Sant'Angelo in Vado in 1635 became a city, and then an episcopal see. Urbania in 1280 was demolished by the Ghibellines. It was restored again by the Dominican bishop, Guglielmo Durante and called Castel Durante; it was included in the Duchy of Urbino, and contained a magnificent ducal palace. I

At the beginning of 1635 S. Angelo was an archpresbyterate nullius, subject to the Abbot of the Monastery of S. Cristoforo of Castel Durante, to whom the Archpresbyterate of Castel Durante was also subject. In that year Pope Urban VIII erected the two towns into dioceses, changing the name of Castel Durante to Urbania, and uniting them aeque principaliter under Onorato degli Onorati, who governed it for forty-eight years. Other bishops were: Gian. Vincenzo Castelli, O.P. (1711), who restored the cathedral of Urbania, and Paolo Zamperoli, O.P. (1779) sent into exile under Napoleon, dying there.

Ordinaries

Diocese of Urbania e Sant’Angelo in Vado
Erected:18 February 1636
Latin Name: Urbaniensis et Sancti Angeli in Vado
Metropolitan: Archdiocese of Urbino

Onorato Onorati (22 Sep 1636 – Aug 1683 Resigned)
Horatius Ondedei (10 Apr 1684 – Mar 1688 Died)
Pietro Barugi (15 Nov 1688 – May 1708 Died) 
Antonio Antonelli (6 May 1709 – 17 Nov 1711 Died) 
Giovanni Vincenzo Castelli, O.P. (21 Mar 1714 – Sep 1736 Died) 
Giuseppe Fabbretti (19 Nov 1736 – 18 Nov 1747 Died) 
Deodato Baiardi, O.S.H. (18 Dec 1747 – 28 Nov 1776 Died) 
Giovanni Pergolini (17 Feb 1777 – Aug 1779 Died) 
Paol'Antonio Agostini Zamperoli (13 Dec 1779 – 1812 Died) 
Francesco Leonini (22 Jul 1816 – 9 Apr 1822 Died) 
Francesco Tassinari (27 Sep 1824 – 27 Dec 1832 Died) 
Lorenzo Parigini (15 Apr 1833 – 24 Dec 1848 Died) 
Antonio Boscarini (20 Apr 1849 – 3 Jun 1872 Died) 
Giovanni Maria Majoli (29 Jul 1872 – 19 Jun 1893 Died) 
Francesco Baldassarri (18 May 1894 – 15 Apr 1901 Appointed, Bishop of Imola) 
Antonio Valbonesi (15 Apr 1901 – 4 May 1906 Resigned) 
Luigi Giacomo Baccini, O.F.M. Cap. (25 Aug 1908 – 16 Jan 1935 Died) 
Giovanni Capobianco (1 Apr 1935 – 7 Apr 1965 Died) 
Ugo Donato Bianchi (23 May 1977 – 30 Sep 1986 Appointed, Archbishop of Urbino-Urbania-Sant'Angelo in Vado)

30 September 1986: United with the Archdiocese of Urbino to form the Archdiocese of Urbino-Urbania-Sant'Angelo in Vado

Notes

References

Attribution

Urbania